Gahnia halmaturina is a tussock-forming perennial in the family Cyperaceae, that is native to parts of South Australia.

References

halmaturina
Plants described in 2012
Flora of South Australia
Taxa named by Karen Louise Wilson
Taxa named by Russell Lindsay Barrett